Cyril Bohui Zabou (born 18 June 1996) is a French professional footballer who plays as midfielder for Liga I club FC Botoșani.

Professional career

Chambly
On 14 May 2020, Zabou signed his first professional contract with Chambly.  He made his professional debut with Chambly in a 2–1 Ligue 2 loss to Grenoble on 12 September 2020.

Quevilly-Rouen
On 28 July 2021, he moved to Quevilly-Rouen on a one-year contract.

Botoșani
On 20 September 2022, Zabou agreed to a two-year deal at Botoșani.

Personal life
Born in France, Zabou is of Ivorian descent.

References

External links
 

1996 births
Living people
Sportspeople from Bondy
French footballers
French sportspeople of Ivorian descent
Association football midfielders
FC Chambly Oise players
Bourges 18 players
US Quevilly-Rouen Métropole players
Ligue 2 players
Championnat National 2 players
Championnat National 3 players
Liga I players
FC Botoșani players
Footballers from Seine-Saint-Denis
French expatriate footballers
Expatriate footballers in Romania
French expatriate sportspeople in Romania